Vreta may refer to:
A part of Häggeby och Vreta, a locality in Håbo Municipality, Sweden
A part of Ytternäs och Vreta, a locality situated in Uppsala Municipality, Sweden
A village in Kimitoön Municipality, Finland
Vreta Abbey, an abbey in Linköping Municipality, Sweden